Class I  may refer to:
Class I antiarrhythmic
Class I electrical appliance, a device constructed according to electrical grounding specifications in the IEC 60536-2 standard
Class I bacteriocin, a type of toxin produced by some bacteria
Class I biosafety cabinet
Class I laser, a type of eye-safe laser defined in the ANSI Z136 standard
Class I rail carrier, a type of major freight railroad company in Canada
Class I railroad, a type of major freight railroad company in the United States

See also
Class 1 (disambiguation)
I class (disambiguation)